Meditsinskaya Tekhnika (English: Medical Engineering) is a bimonthly Russian peer-reviewed scientific journal established in 1967 and covering the field of biomedical engineering. The editor-in-chief is Sergey V. Selishchev (since 2008).

An English translation is published by Springer Science+Business Media (Springer New York) under the title Biomedical Engineering (since 1967).

External links 
  
 Journal page on publisher's site 

Biomedical engineering journals
Multilingual journals
Springer Science+Business Media academic journals
Bimonthly journals
Publications established in 1967